The 2012–13 Savannah State Tigers basketball team represented Savannah State University during the 2012–13 NCAA Division I men's basketball season. The Tigers, led by eighth year head coach Horace Broadnax, played their home games at Tiger Arena and were members of the Mid-Eastern Athletic Conference. They finished the season 19–15, 11–5 in MEAC play to finish in a tie for third place. They lost in the quarterfinals of the MEAC tournament to Morgan State. They were invited to the 2013 CIT where they lost in the first round to East Carolina.

Roster

Schedule

|-
!colspan=9| Exhibition

|-
!colspan=9| Regular season

|-
!colspan=9| 2013 MEAC men's basketball tournament

|-
!colspan=9| 2013 CIT

References

Savannah State Tigers basketball seasons
Savannah State
Savannah State
Savannah State Tigers basketball team
Savannah State Tigers basketball team